The men's High Jump at the 2014 IAAF World Indoor Championships took place on 8–9 March 2014.

Medalists

Records

Qualification standards

Schedule

Results

Qualification
Qualification: 2.31 (Q) or at least 8 best performers (q) qualified for the final.

Final

References

High Jump
High jump at the World Athletics Indoor Championships